George Barry or Barrie may refer to:

George Barry (author) (1748–1805), author of a History of the Orkney Islands
George Richard Barry (1825–1867), Member of the UK Parliament for Cork County
George Barrie (1912–2002), owner and CEO of Fabergé Inc.
George Barrie (footballer) (1904–?), Scottish football player